OFK Malženice is a Slovak football team, based in the town of Malženice. Since the season 2021/2022 is OFK Malženice farm club of FC Spartak Trnava.

Current squad

Colours
Club colours are green and white.

External links
Profile at Ligy.sk 
  
Club profile at Futbalnet.sk

References

Football clubs in Slovakia
Association football clubs established in 1931